Óscar Clemente Mues (born 26 March 1999) is a Spanish footballer who plays for UD Las Palmas as an attacking midfielder.

Club career
Born in Adeje, Santa Cruz de Tenerife, Canary Islands, Clemente joined Atlético Madrid's youth setup in September 2013, from Club Atlético Chenet. He made his senior debut with the reserves on 26 August 2018, starting in a 1–1 Segunda División B away draw against AD Unión Adarve.

Clemente scored his first senior goal on 14 October 2018, netting the opener in a 3–0 home defeat of Celta de Vigo B. On 6 October of the following year, he scored a brace in a 5–1 away routing of Pontevedra CF.

Clemente made his first team – and La Liga – debut on 18 January 2020, coming on as a late substitute for Vitolo in a 0–2 loss at SD Eibar. Five days later, he renewed his contract with Atleti until 2022.

On 19 August 2020, Clemente signed a three-year contract with Segunda División side UD Las Palmas.

References

External links

1999 births
Living people
People from Tenerife
Sportspeople from the Province of Santa Cruz de Tenerife
Spanish footballers
Footballers from the Canary Islands
Association football midfielders
La Liga players
Segunda División players
Segunda División B players
Atlético Madrid B players
Atlético Madrid footballers
UD Las Palmas players